Flowerdale is a locality and small rural community of Waratah-Wynyard, in north-west Tasmania. Significant geographic features include the Inglis River and the confluence of its largest tributary, the Flowerdale River. The 2011 census determined a population of 324 for the state suburb of Flowerdale, which includes Flowerdale and the nearby Table Cape locality.

History
Flowerdale Post Office opened on 1 March 1891 and closed in 1981.

The Preolenna line was a railway line which extended from the Flowerdale junction, to as far as Maweena, a small distance past Preolenna. It was first opened in 1917 but was soon closed in 1931 - in one of its annual reports, the TGR operators had described the traffic along the route as "infintecimal".

Notes and references

Localities of Waratah–Wynyard Council
Towns in Tasmania